Kim Bong-Gil (born March 15, 1966) is a South Korean football coach and former player. He is the current manager of China League One side Shaanxi Chang'an Athletic.

Football career
Kim was one of top wing forward in K League. After graduate Yonsei University, he joined Yukong Elephants, present Jeju United and was awarded 1993 K League Best MF. In 1995, Kim moved to Jeonnam Dragons and retired in 1998. 
He made debut as South Korea National Team for 1988 Asian Cup when he was in amateur level.

Managerial career
Kim began his managerial career as head coach of one of top team in U-18 level Bupyeong High School and Baegam High School. In 2005, Kim joined Jeonnam Dragons as assistant coach of Huh Jung-Moo, former South Korea National Team coach. After three years, he joined Incheon United as assistant coach of Chang Woe-Ryong. On 8 June 2010, Serbian coach Ilija Petkovic was fired and the club appointed Kim to interim coach. On 23 August 2010, Huh Jung-Moo was appointed to Head Coach of Incheon United, but the club fired him on 11 April 2012. Kim was appointed to his second spell as interim coach and finally was confirmed as head coach of Incheon United on 16 July 2012. He rebuilt squad quickly and made his team qualified to split A group. This above achievement made his nickname so called "Bong-Gil Magic". On 19 December 2014, Incheon United dismissed Kim which caused controversy.

On 16 December 2019, Kim was appointed as the manager of Chinese club Shaanxi Chang'an Athletics, to compete in the 2020 China League One.

Kim Bong-Gil is also famous for spotting and nurturing young talent like Moon Sang-yun, Koo Bon-sang, Han Kyo-Won, Lee Seok-hyun, Jeong Hyuk, etc.

References

External links
 

1966 births
Living people
South Korean footballers
South Korea international footballers
Association football forwards
Jeju United FC players
Jeonnam Dragons players
K League 1 players
South Korean football managers
Incheon United FC managers
1988 AFC Asian Cup players
Yonsei University alumni
Expatriate football managers in China
Sportspeople from Incheon